Alan William Cuthbert,  (7 May 1932 – 27 August 2016) was a British pharmacologist and fellow of University College London.

Life 
Cuthbert was born in Peterborough, England. He was a research professor at Addenbrooke's Hospital, located at the University of Cambridge.

From 1979 to 1999 he was Sheild Professor of Pharmacology, and from 1991 to 1999 he served as master of Fitzwilliam College, Cambridge. He died at the age of 84 on 27 August 2016.

References

External links
Alan Cuthbert interviewed by Mike Edwardson on Vimeo

1932 births
2016 deaths
Academics of University College London
British pharmacologists
Fellows of Fitzwilliam College, Cambridge
Fellows of the Royal Society
Masters of Fitzwilliam College, Cambridge
People from Peterborough
Professors of the University of Cambridge